Cynaeda alticolalis is a moth in the family Crambidae. It was described by Hugo Theodor Christoph in 1877 and is found in Iran.

References

Moths described in 1877
Odontiini